This is a list of releases in which RCA/Jive Label Group is the copyright holder.  The appropriate sub label is also listed.

Discographies of American record labels